Kusumanchi is a village in Khammam district of Telangana in India. It is the headquarters of Kusumanchi mandal.

Population
As per 2011 Census, the town has a population of 11,563.

Literacy
Kusumanchi village has a literacy rate of 63.02% according to 2011 Census.

References

Villages in Khammam district
Tourist attractions in Khammam district